The National Sports Media Association (NSMA), formerly the National Sportscasters and Sportswriters Association, is an organization of sports media members in the United States, and constitutes the American chapter of the International Sports Press Association (AIPS).

Winston-Salem, North Carolina now serves as the headquarters for the NSMA, which is responsible for the organizing and counting of all the ballots for the National, State (50 states plus D.C.), and Hall of Fame winners. The organization had been based in Salisbury, North Carolina until 2017. There are now more than 100 inductees in the Hall of Fame. The organization plans and funds the Annual Awards Program.

Former television sportscaster Dave Goren serves as the NSMA's executive director.

History
The National Sportscasters and Sportswriters Association (NSSA) was formed in 1959 by a local restaurant owner, Pete DiMizio, to honor regional sportscasters and sportswriters whom he had met at the Greensboro Open Golf Tournament in Greensboro, North Carolina. When DiMizio died, Dr. Ed McKenzie took over the leadership role and guided it through the expansion to a national association. Its first Annual Awards Program was held in Salisbury, North Carolina, on April 12, 1960. Lindsey Nelson was selected the 1959 National Sportscaster of the Year and Red Smith was voted the 1959 Sportswriter of the Year. 

In 1962 Grantland Rice was selected as the first Hall of Fame inductee. As Red Smith inducted Rice into the Hall of Fame, he said, "Who knows what will become of this Hall of Fame? It might never be heard from again. No matter, it cannot be improved, for it is perfect tonight with only Granny enshrined."

In April 1990, the NSSA celebrated its 31st Annual Awards Program, with Chris Berman of ESPN being selected as Sportscaster of the Year and Peter Gammons receiving the honor as Sportswriter of the Year. The Hall of Fame inductees were Dave Anderson, Pulitzer Prize winner from The New York Times, and Jack Buck, the long-time radio voice of the St. Louis Cardinals and a radio and television sportscaster for CBS.

Though located in Salisbury, "the NSSA office itself has bounced around town like a ping-pong ball." The Hall of Fame opened officially on May 1, 2000 in the two-story, 10,000-square-foot former North Carolina Federal Savings and Loan building at 322 East Innes Street in Salisbury. When Claude Hampton became NSSA director, he was told the Hall of Fame was nothing more than a desk drawer with folders in the Chamber of Commerce building. He wanted an actual building and considered Catawba College as a location, but when he saw the branch of the failed bank in 1990, he made an offer which was accepted. The goal was to open the museum by 1992. A 23-foot sculpture of two eagles was moved from the bank to Charlotte Motor Speedway, but people wanted the eagles back, so they were returned and local people donated their services to put the eagles back and get the building ready. An opening reception and dedication took place in 1991. But due to lack of funding, it took ten years for the building to actually open. Until then, hundreds of thousands of dollars worth of memorabilia were stored in boxes. With the Hall of Fame open, visitors could hear Babe Ruth's called shot, Hank Aaron's 715th home run, the Ice Bowl, the 1992 Duke-Kentucky game, and young Tiger Woods on The Mike Douglas Show. 

On November 1, 2005, Community Bank of Rowan (later part of Yadkin Financial) purchased the Innes Street location, opening its headquarters there in 2006. This required the NSSA to move to a temporary location on North Main Street in Salisbury, but visitors would not be allowed. Veteran sports journalist Dave Goren, best known as sports director at WXII-TV in Winston-Salem, North Carolina, became NSSA executive director September 1, 2009. On December 1 of that year, the NSSA held a reception at its new office in 1,900 square feet at 325 Lee Street in Salisbury. The warehouse only included a few items such as shoes autographed by Ralph Sampson and a football signed by Berman; the rest remained in storage.  The NSSA has since moved to Summit Avenue in Salisbury, on the campus of Catawba College.

At the 54th annual program in June 2013, Dan Patrick of ESPN Radio received the award as Sportscaster of the Year with Peter King of Sports Illustrated honored as Sportswriter of the Year. The Hall of Fame inductees were Mitch Albom and Dick Vitale.

In June 2014, hockey broadcaster Mike "Doc" Emrick was voted Sportscaster of the Year, with King repeating as Sportswriter of the Year. Inducted in the Hall of Fame were sportscaster Marv Albert and sportswriter Rick Reilly.

Emrick and writer Tom Verducci were the national award winners honored on June 8, 2015. Four new NSSA Hall of Fame members were inducted: baseball writer Hal McCoy, basketball commentator Bill Raftery, sportswriter and sportscaster Lesley Visser and, posthumously, author, journalist and television personality Dick Schaap.

In April 2017, after 57 years in Salisbury, the National Sports Media Association moved to Winston-Salem, North Carolina.

Organization
The NSSA is the only national organization which brings together the two crafts of sportscasting and sportswriting. There are approximately 1,100 dues-paying members. The Sportscasters and Sportswriters Foundation Board is made up of individuals in Salisbury, North Carolina, as well as the current national board president, who feel that sports in the United States are important. The Sportscasters and Sportswriters themselves have a Board of Directors. In addition, The Hall of Fame, Inc. has been set up as the educational arm of the NSSA, and it has tax-exempt status granted by the Internal Revenue Service.

Paul "Bear" Bryant Award

The Paul "Bear" Bryant Award is an award that has been given annually since 1986 to NCAA college football's national coach of the year. The Award was named in honor of longtime Alabama coach Bear Bryant after he died of a heart attack in 1983. It is voted on by the NSMA, and proceeds from the awards ceremony benefit the American Heart Association. The College Football Coach of the Year Award began in 1957 and was renamed for Bryant in 1986. Bryant himself won the AFCA Coach of the Year award in 1961, 1971, and 1973. According to the official website:
The Paul "Bear" Bryant College Football Coaching Award ceremony is an exclusive event that honors a college football coach whose great accomplishments, both on and off the field, are legendary. The award recognizes the masters of coaching and allows them to take their deserved place in history beside other legends like Bear Bryant.

Clarence "Big House" Gaines Awards

The NSMA established the Clarence "Big House" Gaines College Basketball Coach of the Year Awards in 2010, with the first presentation occurring in 2011. The awards are presented to two head coaches – one in NCAA Division I and one in Division II – at the annual NSMA awards banquet. The purpose of the award is to recognize coaches who might not receive recognition from "mainstream outlets." An NSMA committee votes after the end of the men's and women's championship tournaments. The award is named for Clarence Gaines, the former head coach of Winston-Salem State University.

National Sportscaster of the Year
For list of winners, see footnote

1959 – Lindsey Nelson (NBC)
1960 – Lindsey Nelson (NBC)
1961 – Lindsey Nelson (NBC)
1962 – Lindsey Nelson (NBC)
1963 – Chris Schenkel (CBS)
1964 – Chris Schenkel (CBS)
1965 – Vin Scully (L. A. Dodgers)
1966 – Curt Gowdy (NBC)
1967 – Chris Schenkel (ABC)
1968 – Ray Scott (CBS)
1969 – Curt Gowdy (NBC)
1970 – Chris Schenkel (ABC)
1971 – Ray Scott (CBS)
1972 – Keith Jackson (ABC)
1973 – Keith Jackson (ABC)
1974 – Keith Jackson (ABC)
1975 – Keith Jackson (ABC)
1976 – Keith Jackson (ABC)
1977 – Pat Summerall (CBS)
1978 – Vin Scully (L.A. Dodgers, CBS)
1979 – Dick Enberg (NBC)
1980 – Dick Enberg (NBC) and Al Michaels (ABC)
1981 – Dick Enberg (NBC)
1982 – Vin Scully (L.A. Dodgers, CBS)
1983 – Al Michaels (ABC)
1984 – John Madden (CBS)
1985 – Bob Costas (NBC)
1986 – Al Michaels (ABC)
1987 – Bob Costas (NBC)
1988 – Bob Costas (NBC)
1989 – Chris Berman (ESPN)
1990 – Chris Berman (ESPN)
1991 – Bob Costas (NBC)
1992 – Bob Costas (NBC)
1993 – Chris Berman (ESPN)
1994 – Chris Berman (ESPN)
1995 – Bob Costas (NBC)
1996 – Chris Berman (ESPN)
1997 – Bob Costas (NBC)
1998 – Jim Nantz (CBS)
1999 – Dan Patrick (ESPN)
2000 – Bob Costas (NBC, HBO)
2001 – Chris Berman (ESPN)
2002 – Joe Buck (Fox)
2003 – Joe Buck (Fox)
2004 – Joe Buck (Fox)
2005 – Jim Nantz (CBS)
2006 – Joe Buck (Fox)
2007 – Jim Nantz (CBS)
2008 – Jim Nantz (CBS)
2009 – Jim Nantz (CBS)
2010 – Mike Tirico (ABC, ESPN)
2011 – Dan Shulman (ESPN)
2012 – Dan Patrick (NBC)
2013 – Mike Emrick (NBC)
2014 – Mike Emrick (NBC)
2015 – Mike Emrick (NBC)
2016 – Vin Scully (L.A. Dodgers)
2017 – Kevin Harlan (CBS, Turner)
2018 - Doris Burke (ESPN, ABC)
2019 – Kevin Harlan (CBS, Turner)
2020 – Mike Emrick (NBC)
2021 – Ernie Johnson Jr. (Turner) and Scott Van Pelt (ESPN)
2022 – Ian Eagle (CBS)

National Sportswriter of the Year
For a list of winners, see footnote
Jim Murray, writing for the Los Angeles Times, won the National Sportswriter of the Year award a record 14 times, including 12 years in succession from 1966 to 1977. More recently, Rick Reilly, writing for Sports Illustrated and ESPN, has won 11 awards.

1959 – Red Smith (New York Herald-Tribune)           
1960 – Red Smith (New York Herald-Tribune)
1961 – Red Smith (New York Herald-Tribune)
1962 – Red Smith (New York Herald-Tribune)
1963 – Arthur Daley (New York Times)
1964 – Jim Murray (Los Angeles Times)
1965 – Red Smith (New York Herald-Tribune)
1966 – Jim Murray (Los Angeles Times)
1967 – Jim Murray (Los Angeles Times)
1968 – Jim Murray (Los Angeles Times)
1969 – Jim Murray (Los Angeles Times)
1970 – Jim Murray (Los Angeles Times)
1971 – Jim Murray (Los Angeles Times)
1972 – Jim Murray (Los Angeles Times)
1973 – Jim Murray (Los Angeles Times)
1974 – Jim Murray (Los Angeles Times)
1975 – Jim Murray (Los Angeles Times)
1976 – Jim Murray (Los Angeles Times)
1977 – Jim Murray (Los Angeles Times)
1978 – Will Grimsley (Associated Press)
1979 – Jim Murray (Los Angeles Times)
1980 – Will Grimsley (Associated Press)
1981 – Will Grimsley (Associated Press)
1982 – Frank Deford (Sports Illustrated)
1983 – Frank Deford (Sports Illustrated)
1984 – Frank Deford (Sports Illustrated)
1985 – Frank Deford (Sports Illustrated)
1986 – Frank Deford (Sports Illustrated)
1987 – Frank Deford (Sports Illustrated)
1988 – Frank Deford (Sports Illustrated)
1989 – Peter Gammons (Sports Illustrated)
1990 – Peter Gammons (Boston Globe)
1991 – Rick Reilly (Sports Illustrated)
1992 – Rick Reilly (Sports Illustrated)
1993 – Peter Gammons (Boston Globe, ESPN)
1994 – Rick Reilly (Sports Illustrated)
1995 – Rick Reilly (Sports Illustrated)
1996 – Rick Reilly (Sports Illustrated)
1997 – Dave Kindred (Sporting News)
1998 – Mitch Albom (Detroit Free Press)
1999 – Rick Reilly (Sports Illustrated)
2000 – Bob Ryan (Boston Globe)
2001 – Rick Reilly (Sports Illustrated)
2002 – Rick Reilly (Sports Illustrated)
2003 – Rick Reilly (Sports Illustrated)
2004 – Rick Reilly (Sports Illustrated)
2005 – Steve Rushin (Sports Illustrated)
2006 – Rick Reilly (Sports Illustrated)
2007 – Bob Ryan (Boston Globe)
2008 – Bob Ryan (Boston Globe)
2009 – Bob Ryan (Boston Globe)
2010 – Peter King (Sports Illustrated)
2011 – Peter King (Sports Illustrated)
2012 – Joe Posnanski (Sports Illustrated)
2013 – Peter King (Sports Illustrated)
2014 – Tom Verducci (Sports Illustrated)
2015 – Tom Verducci (Sports Illustrated)
2016 – Tom Verducci (Sports Illustrated)
2017 – Adrian Wojnarowski (ESPN)
2018 – Adrian Wojnarowski (ESPN)
2019 – Adrian Wojnarowski (ESPN)
2020 – Nicole Auerbach (The Athletic)
2021 – Jeff Passan (ESPN)
2022 – Ken Rosenthal (The Athletic)/Pete Thamel (ESPN) - Co-winners

State winners
See footnote

Sportscaster of the Year (1959–present; in each state and the District of Columbia)
Sportswriter of the Year (1959–present; in each state and the District of Columbia)

Hall of Fame

Each spring, the NSMA Hall of Fame inducts one or more new members. There were not any inductees in 1965, 1966, 1968, and 2006.

1962 – Grantland Rice
1963 – Ted Husing
1964 – Damon Runyon
1964 – Graham McNamee
1965 – (no induction)
1966 – (no induction)
1967 – Ring Lardner
1968 – (no induction)
1969 – J. G. Taylor Spink
1970 – Clem McCarthy
1971 – John Kieran
1972 – Mel Allen
1973 – Arch Ward
1973 – Red Barber
1974 – Bill Stern
1974 – Stanley Woodward
1975 – Dan Parker
1975 – Russ Hodges
1976 – Arthur Daley
1976 – Dizzy Dean
1977 – Red Smith
1978 – Jesse Owens
1978 – Jim Murray
1979 – John Wayne
1979 – Lindsey Nelson
1980 – Bob Considine
1980 – Lou Gehrig
1981 – Chris Schenkel
1981 – Curt Gowdy
1982 – Ray Scott
1983 – Jack Brickhouse
1984 – Shirley Povich
1985 – Si Burick
1986 – Bob Prince
1986 – Don Dunphy
1986 – Jimmy Cannon
1987 – Jim McKay
1987 – Will Grimsley
1988 – Fred Russell
1988 – Harry Caray
1988 – Jack Murphy
1989 – Furman Bisher
1989 – Ernie Harwell
1990 – Dave Anderson
1990 – Jack Buck
1990 – Knute Rockne
1990 – Ronald Reagan
1991 – Blackie Sherrod
1991 – Vin Scully
1992 – Dick Connor
1993 – Howard Cosell
1993 – Marty Glickman
1993 – Murray Olderman
1994 – Edwin Pope
1994 – John Carmichael
1994 – Pat Summerall
1995 – Keith Jackson
1995 – Mel Durslag
1996 – Dan Jenkins
1996 – Dick Enberg
1997 – Chick Hearn
1997 – Bob Broeg
1998 – Al Michaels
1998 – Frank Deford
1999 – John Steadman*
1999 – Jon Miller
2000 – Jerry Izenberg
2000 – Jim Simpson
2001 – George Vecsey
2001 – Jack Whitaker
2001 – W.C. Heinz
2002 – Bob Murphy
2002 – Bud Collins
2003 – Bob Wolff
2003 – Will McDonough
2004 – Jerome Holtzman
2004 – Joe Garagiola
2005 – Marty Brennaman
2005 – Sally Jenkins
2006 – (no induction)
2007 – Dave Kindred
2007 – Verne Lundquist
2008 – Harry Kalas
2008 – Mary Garber
2009 – Larry Munson
2009 – Leigh Montville
2010 – John Madden
2010 – Peter Gammons
2011 – Bob Ryan
2011 – Bob Uecker
2011 – Brent Musburger
2012 – Bob Costas
2012 – John Feinstein
2013 – Mitch Albom
2013 – Dick Vitale
2014 – Marv Albert
2014 – Rick Reilly
2015 – Hal McCoy
2015 – Bill Raftery
2015 – Dick Schaap
2015 – Lesley Visser
2016 – Chris Berman
2016 – Billy Packer
2016 – David Halberstam
2016 – Gary Smith
2017 – Frank Gifford
2017 – Linda Cohn
2017 – Sam Lacy
2017 – Mike Lupica
2018 – Thomas Boswell
2018 – Woody Durham
2018 – Bryant Gumbel
2018 – Dick Weiss
2019 – Mike Emrick
2019 – Bob Ley
2019 – Peter King
2019 – Tony Kornheiser
2020 – Skip Caray
2020 – Cawood Ledford
2020 – Dan Patrick
2020 – Tom Verducci
2020 – Michael Wilbon
2020 – Dick Young
2021 – Bill King
2021 – Larry Merchant
2021 – William Nack
2021 – Jim Nantz
2021 – William C. Rhoden
2021 – Dick Stockton
2021 – Rick Telander
2022 – Hubie Brown
2022 – Curry Kirkpatrick
2022 – Jackie MacMullan
2022 – Stuart Scott
2023 – Lee Corso
2023 – Bill Plaschke
2023 – Dan Kelly
2023 – Roger Angell

See also

Baseball Writers' Association of America (BBWAA)
National Collegiate Baseball Writers Association
Pro Basketball Writers Association
United States Basketball Writers Association (college)
Football Writers Association of America (college)
Pro Football Writers Association
Professional Hockey Writers Association
Boxing Writers Association of America (BWAA)
National Turf Writers Association
New Jersey Sports Writers Association
New York State Sportswriters Association
Philadelphia Sports Writers Association

Footnotes

External links
National Sports Media Association (NSMA) official website
Our History. NSSA website. Retrieved 2011-08-21.

American sports journalism organizations
Journalism-related professional associations
Sports organizations established in 1959
Organizations based in Winston-Salem, North Carolina